There are a number of radio stations broadcasting in the Polish language, mostly inside Poland, but several outside Poland (in United States and elsewhere in countries with large groups of Polonia).

Polish radio stations

Polskie Radio (public broadcaster) 
 Program 1 (Jedynka) - (news, current affairs, easy listening music, focused at listeners aged 40-64) - 225 LW, FM, DAB+ and the Internet
 Program 2 (Dwójka) - (classical music, drama, comedy, literature) - FM, DAB+ and the Internet
 Program 3 (Trójka) - (rock, alternative, Middle of the Road, focused at listeners aged 25-49) - FM, DAB+ and the Internet
 Polskie Radio 24 - (news/talk) - FM, DAB+ and the Internet
 Audytorium 17 - (public regional radio network) - FM, DAB+ and the Internet
 Radio Poland - (external service in Polish, Belarusian, Ukrainian, German, English and Russian) - 1386 AM, FM (in selected areas abroad), DAB+ (in Poland), satellite and the Internet
 Program 4 (Czwórka) - (dance, R&B, reggae, rap, soul, focused at listeners aged 15-29) - DAB+ and the Internet
 Polskie Radio Chopin - (Polish classical music) - DAB+ and the Internet
 Polskie Radio Dzieciom - (kids/learning) - DAB+ and the Internet
 Polskie Radio Kierowców (Polish Radio for Drivers) - (road news, automotive news and rock music) - DAB+ and the Internet
 59 thematic radio channels on moje.polskieradio.pl

Privately owned stations 

Bauer Media Group company:

 RMF FM - hot adult contemporary radio (target demographic 18-44) (nationwide)
 RMF MAXX - contemporary hit radio (target demographic 13-34) (22 local stations)
 RADIO RMF 24
 RMF UKRAINA 
 RMF Classic - classical and film music (cross-regional station in 19 cities)
 Radio Gra - two local stations in Toruń and Wrocław.
 Radio Jura - local station in Częstochowa.
 Radio 90 - local station in Rybnik/Cieszyn.
 Radiofonia - University Radio in Kraków.

Eurozet company:

 Radio Zet - hot adult contemporary radio (Target Demographic 21-49) (nationwide)
 Meloradio - soft adult contemporary radio (19 local stations)
 Chillizet - chillout and jazz music (4 local stations)
 Antyradio - rock and metal music (cross-regional station in 16 cities)

Agora SA company:

 TOK FM - rolling news, talk, current affairs (cross-regional station in 19 cities)
 Radio Złote Przeboje - mainly oldies music (Target Demographic 30-49) (23 local stations)
 Radio Pogoda - retro music (7 local stations)
 Rock Radio - classic rock music (Target Demographic 18-39) (4 local stations)

Grupa ZPR Media company:

 Radio Eska - contemporary hit radio (target demographic 15-34) (39 local stations)
 Eska Rock - mainly rock music (local station broadcasting in Warsaw)
 VOX FM - mostly disco & dance music (cross-regional station in 18 cities)
 Radio SuperNova - only Polish music (11 local stations)
 MUZO.FM - rock, indie and news station (cross-regional station in 9 cities)
 Radio Plus - upbeat oldies from the 1970s, ’80s & ’90s and Catholic broadcasting (target demographic 40 and older) (18 local stations, some in cooperation with Eurozet)

Other radio stations

 Radio Maryja - catolic (nationwide)
 Radio Wnet - universal (cross-regional station in 9 cities)

Independent local radio stations, broadcasting on FM

 Akademickie Radio Centrum (Lublin)
 Akademickie Radio Centrum (Rzeszów)
 Akademickie Radio Index (Zielona Góra)
 Akademickie Radio Kampus (Warszawa)
 Akademickie Radio LUZ (Wrocław)
 Białoruskie Radio Racja
 Bon Ton Radio (Chełm)
 Diecezjalne Radio Nadzieja (Łomża)
 Emaus – Katolickie Radio Poznań
 Katolickie Radio Anioł Beskidów (Bielsko-Biała)
 Katolickie Radio Podlasie (Siedlce)
 Katolickie Radio Rodzina (Wrocław)
 Katolickie Radio Zamość (Zamość)
 KRDP – Katolickie Radio Diecezji Płockiej (Ciechanów)
 KRDP – Katolickie Radio Diecezji Płockiej (Płock)
 Muzyczne Radio (Jelenia Góra)
 Nasze Radio (Sieradz)
 Nasze Radio Nostalgicznie (Zduńska Wola)
 POPradio (Pruszków)
 Radio Kaszëbë
 Radio 5 Ełk
 Radio 5 Suwałki
 Radio 7 (Mława)
 Radio Afera (Poznań)
 Radio Akadera (Białystok)
 Radio Alex (Zakopane)
 Radio Bartoszyce
 Radio Bayer FM (Suwałki)
 Radio Bielsko
 Radio Bogoria (Grodzisk Mazowiecki)
 Radio CCM
 Radio Centrum (Kalisz)
 Radio Doxa (Opole)
 Radio Elka (Głogów)
 Radio Elka (Leszno)
 Radio eM Katowice
 Radio eM Kielce
 Radio Express FM (Tychy)
 Radio Fama Kielce
 Radio Fama Słupsk
 Radio Fama Tomaszów
 Radio Fama Wołomin
 Radio Fama Żyrardów
 Radio Fara (Przemyśl)
 Radio Fest (Chorzów)
 Radio Fiat (Częstochowa)
 Radio Głos (Pelplin)
 Radio Gniezno
 Radio Hit (Włocławek)
 Radio i (Białystok)
 Radio Jard (Białystok)
 Radio Jasna Góra (Częstochowa)
 Radio Kolor (Warszawa)
 Radio Kołobrzeg
 Radio Konin FM
 Radio Kujawy (Włocławek)
 Radio Leliwa (Tarnobrzeg)
 Radio LEM FM (Gorlice/Polkowice)
 Radio Malbork
 Radio Nakło
 Radio Niepokalanów (Łódź-Warszawa)
 Radio Norda (Wejherowo)
 Radio Nysa FM
 Radio Oko (Ostrołęka)
 Radio ONY FM (Nysa)
 Radio Ostrowiec
 Radio Parada (Łódź)
 Radio Park (Kędzierzyn-Koźle)
 Radio Piekary
 Radio Płock FM
 Radio Płońsk
 Radio Puławy 24
 Radio Q (Kutno)
 Radio Radom
 Radio Rekord FM (Radom)
 Radio Rekord Mazowsze (Ciechanów)
 Radio Silesia (Zabrze)
 Radio Sochaczew
 Radio Starogard (Starogard Gdański)
 Radio Strefa FM Piotrków
 Radio SUD FM (Kępno)
 Radio Sudety 24 (Strzegom)
 Radio Super FM (Szczecin)
 Radio Tczew
 Radio UWM FM (Olsztyn)
 Radio Vanessa (Racibórz)
 Radio VIA (Rzeszów)
 Radio Victoria (Łowicz)
 Radio Warszawa
 Radio Weekend (Chojnice)
 Radio Wielkopolska
 Radio Września FM
 Radio Ziemi Wieluńskiej (Wieluń)
 Radio Żnin FM
 RDN Małopolska (Tarnów)
 RDN Nowy Sącz
 Rekord – Radio Świętokrzyskie (Ostrowiec Świętokrzyski)
 RSC Radio Skierniewice
 Studenckie Radio Żak (Łódź)
 Trendy Radio (Krosno)
 Twoja Polska Stacja (Częstochowa)
 Twoje Radio (Stargard Szczeciński)

Polish-language stations in the United Kingdom
 Anglo-Polish Radio ORLA.fm
 Radio Star - www.radiostar.net
 Polish Radio London
 mojeradio.uk Moje Radio

Polish-language stations in the United States
 WCPY Chicago 99.9FM
 WEUR Chicago 1490AM
 WNVR Chicago 1030AM
 WNWI Chicago 1080AM
 WRKL New York 910AM

Audience share
Audience share, according to Komitet Badań Radiowych.

References

External links
 URadio 
 RadioPolska 
 Polskie Radio DAB+ 
 Polskie Radio Regional network 

Polish
Poland